Werner Görts (born 15 January 1942 in Wuppertal) is a German former footballer who played as a forward. He spent 13 seasons in the Bundesliga with Borussia Neunkirchen and Werder Bremen.

Honours
Werder Bremen
 Bundesliga runner-up: 1967–68

References

External links
 

1942 births
Living people
Sportspeople from Wuppertal
German footballers
Footballers from North Rhine-Westphalia
Association football forwards
Bundesliga players
Bayer 04 Leverkusen players
Borussia Neunkirchen players
SV Werder Bremen players
West German footballers